Fashion Madness is a 1928 American silent drama film directed by Louis J. Gasnier and starring Claire Windsor, Reed Howes and Laska Winter.

Cast
 Claire Windsor as Gloria Vane 
 Reed Howes as Victor Redding 
 Laska Winter as Tanaka 
 Donald McNamee as Bill 
 Boris Snegoff as Count Costano

References

Bibliography
 Munden, Kenneth White. The American Film Institute Catalog of Motion Pictures Produced in the United States, Part 1. University of California Press, 1997.

External links

1928 films
1928 drama films
Silent American drama films
Films directed by Louis J. Gasnier
American silent feature films
1920s English-language films
Columbia Pictures films
American black-and-white films
1920s American films